The Honduras–Nicaragua border is the roughly  international boundary between Honduras and Nicaragua, running from the Gulf of Fonseca on the Pacific Ocean to the Caribbean Sea. The Coco River, which flows generally northeast to the Caribbean, forms more than half of the border.

The border passes between the following departments, from west to east:
Honduras – Choluteca, Colón, Olancho, Gracias a Dios.
Nicaragua – Chinandega, Madriz, Nueva Segovia, Jinotega and North Caribbean Coast Autonomous Region.

Honduras and Nicaragua, respectively, were part of the Central American Federation and the United Provinces of Central America. Between 1823 and 1838, these federations fell apart and both nations gained their independence and defined their border.

In 1937, the issuance of a stamp from Nicaragua with a sticker on part of Honduran territory indicating "territory in dispute" almost caused a war between the two countries. The territory had been claimed by Nicaragua, but Honduras thought the matter closed in 1906 when an arbitration by King Alfonso XIII of Spain gave it the area.

Location

See also
South Cay
Spanish conquest of Nicaragua
Spanish conquest of Honduras

References 

 
Borders of Honduras
Borders of Nicaragua
International borders